Mizanin is a surname. Notable people with the surname include:

Maryse Mizanin or Maryse Ouellet (born 1984), Canadian-American professional wrestler and actress
Michael Mizanin or The Miz (born 1980), American professional wrestler and actor